Garrett Charles Nash (born June 16, 1993), known by his stage name Gnash (stylized as gnash; pronounced "nash"), is an American musician, rapper, singer, songwriter, DJ and record producer. He released his debut extended play (EP), U, in March 2015 on SoundCloud and followed up with the Me EP in December 2015. His third EP, titled Us, was released in March 2017 and includes the single, "I Hate U, I Love U", featuring Olivia O'Brien, which peaked at number 10 on the Billboard Hot 100 and reached number one in Australia. His debut studio album We was released in January 2019, and also features "I Hate U, I Love U".

Early life
Garrett Charles Nash was born June 16, 1993, in Los Angeles, California to his father, a musician and his mother, a director and producer. Nash is of English, Norwegian, German, Scottish, Irish, Swedish, and Lenape descent.

Before writing his own music, Nash started DJing when he was 13 years old until he began producing cover songs after college.

Career
In 2015, Nash began to release a series of EPs about a previous breakup, starting with U on March 15, 2015 and Me on December 15, 2015. Nash recorded his first two EPs in his garage and produced the song "I Hate U, I Love U" in his garage as well, which eventually became his breakthrough song, peaking at number ten on the Billboard Hot 100. Nash's third EP, Us, was released on March 25, 2016, and peaked at number 46 on the Billboard 200.

In October 2017, Nash was featured on MAX's "Lights Down Low" which peaked at number twenty on the Billboard Hot 100, becoming his second entry on the chart, with "Home", released two weeks later, becoming his second lead entry.

In January 2019, Gnash released his debut album We.

Gnash has cited Death Cab for Cutie, The Postal Service, Kanye West, and Jack Johnson as his musical influences.

Awards and nominations
In 2017, Nash was nominated for his song, "I Hate U, I Love U" (featuring Olivia O'Brien) as the best breakup song at the 2017 Radio Disney Music Awards.

Discography

Studio albums

EPs

Singles

As lead artist

Notes 

 "Forgive" was co-written by Luke Hemmings of 5 Seconds of Summer and Sierra Deaton.

As featured artist

Notes

Guest appearances

Concert tours
The U, Me & Us Tour (2016–2017; North America and Europe)
The Sleepover Tour (2017; North America)
The Young Renegades Tour: Part II (2018; United States)
The Summer After Tour (Fall of 2018; United States)
The Broken Hearts Club Tour (Beginning of 2019)

References

External links
 
 

1993 births
21st-century American male singers
21st-century American rappers
21st-century American singers
American hip hop DJs
American male rappers
American male singer-songwriters
American people of English descent
American people of Norwegian descent
Atlantic Records artists
Living people
Pop rappers
Record producers from California
Singer-songwriters from California
Singers from Los Angeles